Avtokam (Russian: Ассоциация Автокам) was a Russian association of car manufacturers. The company was organised as an association in which members provided their shares in the form of free workshops.

In 1989, during a conference in Yelabuga Tatarstan, it was decided for a new venture to be created for the production of inexpensive vehicles by a screwdriver assembly.

Members
The venture started as an association of manufacturers, with 37 enterprises pooling their resources.

These included the following: Karpov Chemical Plant (Mendeleyevsk), Ivanovo Machine Tool Association (provided plant in Shuya), joint venture "Intertap", Tatneftekhimmontage, and others.

Location
Although it was an executive committee member of the Yelabuzhsky registered company city, it soon moved its headquarters to Naberezhnye Chelny.

Initially, it was planned that the assembly would be carried out in Mendeleyevsky and Shuya.

Foreign Partner
FSV, a British company that released the Rickman Ranger car with rear-wheel drive and the frame structure, was selected as a foreign partner.

According to the agreement, 70% of the car company was to be sent to FSV, with plans to fully localise the assembly in the future.

History
 In 1992, the cars were renamed to Avtokam-2160.

Before the year ended, 48 cars were collected in Mendeleevsk and Shuya, and 2 cars in Stakhanov, Ukraine.

The partnership with FSV ended. It failed to add another 950 kits, and it disappeared.

Due to contradictions among the plants, production discontinued in Shuya, and imported parts were replaced by Russian parts.

 In 1993, production began at the Velta Machine-Building Plant, which led to the formation of a joint venture called Permavto Ltd, together with Avtokam (in 1993 became a joint-stock company), Perm factory "MASHINOSTROITEL", and the Ural Research Institute of composite materials.

The company cars were now called Avtokam-Parma.

 In 1994, Avtokam formed a new Open joint-stock company, named "Perm-avto."
 In 1995, Avtokam left the joint venture by selling their technical documentation.

 In 1995, Zavaod became a subsidiary of the joint Russian-Austrian venture Mende-Rossi. Production in Mendeleevsk lasted until 1997.

In 1997, production discontinued in Perm.

 In 1999, one more car was released, and then its production ceased.

Facilities 
 Toyma plant, Mendeleyevsk (1991-1997)
 Teza plant, Shuya (1991-1992)
 Velta Machine-Building Plant  (1993-1997, 1999)

Models 
 Autokam Ranger (1991)
 Autokam-2160 (1992-1997, 1999)
 Autokam-Parma (1993)
 Autokam-2160 long (1995-1997)
 Velta-2163 (1997)
 Velta-21631 (1997)

References

External links
 Autocom cars in blog "Exclusive Cars" 
 Autokam in  forum for car lovers AZLK 

Defunct motor vehicle manufacturers of Russia
Car manufacturers of Russia
Cars of Russia
Companies based in Tatarstan
Russian brands